The Trubelstock is a mountain of the Bernese Alps, overlooking the Rhone valley near Sierre in the canton of Valais. Its summit (2,998 m) lies between the valleys of Les Outannes and Leukerbad, south of the Wildstrubel.

References

External links
 Trubelstock on Hikr

Mountains of the Alps
Mountains of Switzerland
Mountains of Valais
Two-thousanders of Switzerland